Brian Lacey (born 1974) is an Irish retired Gaelic footballer who played as a right corner-back for the Tipperary and Kildare senior teams.

Born in Tipperary, Lacey first arrived on the inter-county scene at the age of seventeen when he first linked up with the Tipperary minor hurling team before later joining the under-21 football side. He joined the senior football panel during the 1995 championship. Lacey immediately became a regular member of the starting fifteen before later joining the Kildare senior team. Throughout his career he won two Leinster medals and one Tommy Murphy Cup medal.

Lacey was a member of the Munster and Leinster inter-provincial teams on a number of occasions. At club level he is a two-time championship medallist with Round Towers. He began his career with Arravale Rovers.

Lacey retired from inter-county football following the conclusion of the 2006 championship.

He is a brother of former rugby union player and current referee John Lacey.

Honours

Player

Round Towers
Kildare Senior Football Championship (2): 1998, 2003

Tipperary
Tommy Murphy Cup (1): 2005

Kildare
Leinster Senior Football Championship (2): 1998, 2000

References

1974 births
Living people
Arravale Rovers Gaelic footballers
Arravale Rovers hurlers
Round Towers (Kildare) Gaelic footballers
Tipperary inter-county Gaelic footballers
Tipperary inter-county hurlers
Munster inter-provincial Gaelic footballers
Leinster inter-provincial Gaelic footballers